Bannu Subdivision, formerly Frontier Region Bannu (FR Bannu), is a subdivision in Khyber Pakhtunkhwa province of Pakistan. The region is named after Bannu District, which lies to the east, and also borders Karak District and Hangu District to the north, North Waziristan to the west, and Lakki Marwat Subdivision to the south. It is administered by the district coordination officer (DCO) of Bannu District.

Most of the population belong to the Wazir tribe of Pashtuns.

Education
Government Degree College, Kotka Habib Ullah is the only Degree College providing education to this region.

According to the Alif Ailaan Pakistan District Education Rankings 2015, FR Bannu is ranked 67 out of 148 districts in terms of education. For facilities and infrastructure, the district is ranked 75 out of 148.

See also

Federally Administered Tribal Areas
Bannu District

References

External links

Constitutional Provisions on the Tribal Areas - Chapter 3, Part XII of the Constitution of Pakistan
Government of the Federally Administered Tribal Areas
Pakistani Federal Ministry of States and Frontier Regions

Durand Line
Frontier Regions
Frontier